Colonia del Sol (when translated to English is "Colony of the Sun") is a northern suburb of Cabo San Lucas, in Baja California Sur, Mexico. It is the third-largest locality in Los Cabos Municipality. It had a 2015 census population of 64,055 inhabitants and lies at an elevation of 62 m (203 ft.).

References

 2010 census tables: INEGI

Populated places in Baja California Sur